Zdravko Čolić is the seventh studio album by Zdravko Čolić, released in 1988.

Track listing
 Rodi me majko sretnog (Birth Me Lucky, Mother)
 Ne kunite, ne krivite (Don't Swear, Don't Blame)
 Samo ona zna (Only She Knows)
 Da mi nije ove moje tuge (If It Wasn't For This Sorrow Of Mine)
 Hej, suzo (Hej, cigany) (Hey, Tear (Hey, Gypsies))
 Oj djevojko selen, velen (Hey, Fickle Girl)
 Ko te ljubi kad nisam tu (Who Kisses You When I'm Not There)
 Hvala ti nebo (Thank You, Heaven)
 Jastreb (Falcon)
 Ne daj se, mladosti (Don't Give Up, Youth)

1988 albums
Zdravko Čolić albums
Diskoton albums